Władysław Żeleński (11 July 190325 June 2006) was a Polish lawyer, historian and publicist. He lived in the France from the end of World War II until his death in Paris in 2006.

Born in Parchacz, Władysław was a son of Stanisław Gabriel Żeleński (who was a brother of Tadeusz Boy-Żeleński) and Izabella from Madeyskis. He was also a grandson of Władysław Żeleński, a composer.

20th-century Polish historians
Polish male non-fiction writers
Polish publicists
1903 births
2006 deaths
Polish centenarians
Men centenarians
20th-century Polish lawyers
Polish emigrants to France
People associated with the magazine "Kultura"